John Gwilym Jones (27 September 1904 – 16 October 1988) was a Welsh dramatist, novelist, short-story writer, drama director, academic and critic, considered a pre-eminent figure in those fields.  In particular, he is widely acknowledged to be one of the two greatest 20th-century Welsh playwrights, along with Saunders Lewis; of his many plays, Hanes Rhyw Gymro (1964), Ac Eto Nid Myfi (1976) and Yr Adduned (1979) are considered masterpieces.  Almost all of his work was written in the Welsh language.  A writer in the modernist tradition, he is credited with introducing Brechtian techniques, stream-of-consciousness narrative and Freudianism to Welsh literature.  Creative writers such as Kate Roberts and John Rowlands owed him a profound debt, and a whole generation of critics were influenced by his work as a teacher of Welsh literature.

Youth 

Jones was born John William Jones on 27 September 1904 in the village of Groeslon, near Caernarfon in north Wales, the only child of Griffith Thomas Jones, a stonemason, and his wife Jane.  He was to live in Groeslon for the greater part of his life.  He was schooled in Penfforddelen (near Groeslon) and Penygroes, and matriculated at University College of North Wales in 1922.  There the scholar Ifor Williams persuaded him to change his middle name to Gwilym.

Teacher and critic 

In 1926 Jones moved to London to take up a teaching post, then returned to Wales to teach in Llandudno (1930–1944), Pwllheli (1944–1948) and Penygroes (1948–1949).  In 1953 he took up a post as lecturer, later reader, in the Welsh Department of his old college in Bangor, before finally retiring from academic life in 1971. Two years later the University of Wales awarded him an honorary D.Litt.  He was an eminent and influential critic, publishing studies on, among other subjects, Daniel Owen, William Williams Pantycelyn, and the arts of writing and criticism.

Dramatist 

While working in London in the 1920s Jones developed an interest in drama and became an avid West End theatregoer.  He turned to writing plays, the first two of which to be published were Y Brodyr (1934) and Diofal yw Dim (1942).  From 1949 to 1953 he worked for the BBC in Bangor as a producer of radio plays.  Some of his own shorter plays were originally intended for radio or television; they are collected in Pedair Drama (1971).  He also helped to start up Theatr Fach Eryri, one of the more influential Welsh theatre companies of the 1960s.  As a drama director working with this and other amateur companies he is said to have been very accomplished in drawing out excellent performances from inexperienced actors.  In 1958 he published two linked plays under the title Lle Mynno'r Gwynt a Gŵr Llonydd, and in 1963 Y Tad a'r Mab, a technically experimental play treating of obsessional family love.  Hanes Rhyw Gymro (1964), Jones's only historical drama, dealt with the 17th-century Puritan writer Morgan Llwyd.  Cilwg yn Ôl (1965) is a translation of John Osborne's Look Back in Anger, one of many plays he rendered into Welsh.  Three one-act plays by Jones were published as Rhyfedd y'n Gwnaed in 1976, and in Jones's own English translation, One Wedding, Two Rooms, Three Friends, were successfully produced off-Broadway by the Manhattan Theatre Club.  Ac Eto Nid Myfi (1976) has been described as "a masterpiece of the modern Welsh theatre", containing "the quintessence of his philosophy and skill as a dramatist"; its theme is the necessity of every man to come to terms with his environment and culture, the factors which have created him.  His final play was Yr Adduned (1979).

Jones was a keen observer of advances in the techniques of contemporary European theatre.  He was the first Welsh-language dramatist to entirely reject naturalistic staging and to use alienation techniques.  His plays display his understanding of the common people of his native Arfon, and of their ways of thinking and speaking.  His characters are generally intelligent, literate and self-aware.

Novelist and short-story writer 

Y Dewis (1942) was Jones's first published novel.  It was followed in 1946 by his acclaimed volume of short stories Y Goeden Eirin (translated in 2004 as The Plum Tree and Other Short Prose), which has been called "a milestone in the development of the Welsh short story" for its introduction of Freudianism and stream-of-consciousness narrative to Welsh literature.  His second novel, Tri Diwrnod ac Angladd (1979), is said to be the more impressive of the two.  It deals with the complications of family life, and makes much use of symbolism.

Published works 

All are in Welsh unless otherwise stated.

  Play
  Plaid Genedlaethol Cymru political pamphlet
 English translation: 
  Novel
  Play
  Short stories
 English translation: 
  Two plays
  Play
 2nd edition: 
  Play
   Lecture, in Welsh with English translation
  Critical study, in Welsh and English parallel text
  Critical study
  Four plays: Pry Ffenast, Yr Oedfa, Hynt Peredur, and A Barcud yn Farcud Fyth
  Three plays: Tri chyfaill, Dwy Ystafell, and Un Briodas
  Lecture, in Welsh and English, on Daniel Owen
  Play
  Translation by John Gwilym Jones of Friedrich Dürrenmatt's play Der Besuch der alten Dame
  Critical study
  Play
  Novel
  Critical study
  Memoirs, edited by Gwenno Hywyn

References

Sources 

 
 
 
 

1904 births
1988 deaths
20th-century British dramatists and playwrights
20th-century British short story writers
20th-century scholars
20th-century British translators
20th-century Welsh novelists
Academics of Bangor University
BBC radio producers
People from Caernarfonshire
Translators to Welsh
Welsh-language novelists
Welsh literary critics
Welsh male dramatists and playwrights
Welsh male novelists
Welsh short story writers
Welsh television writers
Welsh translators
20th-century screenwriters